Over six thousand Grade I listed buildings are in England (the top grade). This page lists the 105 in the county of Surrey, ordered by district. Of the eleven districts comprising Surrey, Epsom and Ewell is the only one that has none. A notable group are a 13th century set of four bridges, sponsored by Waverley Abbey; Tilford, Elstead and Eashing bridges.

There are also nine Grade I listed parks and gardens in Surrey; not listed here.

Elmbridge

|}

Guildford

|}

Mole Valley

|}

Reigate and Banstead

|}

Runnymede

|}

Spelthorne

|}

Surrey Heath

|}

Tandridge

|}

Waverley

|}

Woking

|}

See also
 Grade II* listed buildings in Surrey

Notes

References
National Heritage List for England

External links

 
Surrey
Lists of listed buildings in Surrey